Tennis in Australia refers to the sport of tennis played in Australia. Tennis in Australia has been administered by Tennis Australia (formerly the Lawn Tennis Association of Australia (LTAA)) since 1904.

Australia hosts the first of the four Grand Slam events of the year, the Australian Open.
The Australian Open is managed by Tennis Australia and was first played in Melbourne in 1905. The tournament was first known as the Australasian Championships and then became the Australian Championships in 1927 and the Australian Open in 1969.

History
In the 1950s, Australia became a tennis power, and Australian men won the Davis Cup 15 times from 1950 to 1967, led by outstanding players such as Frank Sedgman, Ken Rosewall, Lew Hoad, Roy Emerson, and Ashley Cooper.

Rod Laver has twice achieved the Grand Slam in men's singles, in 1962 and 1969, the only tennis player to have accomplished this feat. Fellow Australian tennis player Margaret Smith Court also achieved the Grand Slam in women's singles in 1970, Margaret Court also holds the record for the greatest number of women's singles Grand Slams won and is one of only three players ever to have won a career Grand Slam "boxed set"

Major tournaments and current champions

Pre–Australian Open

Australian Open

Current champions

Most recent finals

Davis Cup

See: Australian Davis Cup Team

Titles - 28 (1907, 1908, 1909, 1911, 1914, 1919, 1939, 1950, 1951, 1952, 1953, 1955, 1956, 1957, 1959, 1960, 1961, 1962, 1964, 1965, 1966, 1967, 1973, 1977, 1983, 1986, 1999, 2003).

Runners-up - 19 (1912, 1920, 1922, 1923, 1924, 1936, 1938, 1946, 1947, 1948, 1949, 1954, 1958, 1963, 1968, 1990, 1993, 2000, 2001).

Fed Cup

See: Australia Fed Cup team

 Titles - 7 (1964, 1965, 1968, 1970, 1971, 1973, 1974)

Runners-up - 10 (1963, 1969, 1975, 1976, 1977, 1978, 1979, 1980, 1984, 1993)

Highest ranked players 
HR = Highest ranking, CR = Current ranking. Players are sorted by highest ranking, then by number of titles.

Singles 
The lists include the 5 best ranked Australian players. The rankings were introduced in 1973 (men) and 1975 (women).

Men

Women

Doubles 
The lists include the 5 best ranked Australian players. The rankings were introduced in 1976 (men) and 1984 (women).

Men

Women

Performance timelines since 2000

Men's singles

Women's singles

See also
:Category:Australian tennis players
List of Australia Davis Cup team representatives

References

External links
Tennis Australia official site
Australian Open official site
Tennis in pictures, a history of tennis in Australia on Culture Victoria